Mutual, or Mutual Consent, is an unincorporated community located at the crossroads of MD 264, MD 265, Ball Road, Grays Road, and Laveille Road in Calvert County, Maryland, United States. La Veille was listed on the National Register of Historic Places in 1973.

References

Unincorporated communities in Calvert County, Maryland
Unincorporated communities in Maryland